Irene Bay is an Arctic waterway in Qikiqtaaluk Region. Nunavut, Canada. It is located in Eureka Sound by western Ellesmere Island.

Geography

Flora
In the late 1980s, several sites of fossilized tree stumps and branches were found on its northern shore, an area now characterized by Arctic willow shrubs.

References

Bays of Qikiqtaaluk Region
Ellesmere Island